South Carolina Highway 56 (SC 56) is a  primary state highway in the state of South Carolina. The highway provides a back country alternative to Interstate 26 (I-26) from Clinton to Spartanburg.

Route description
SC 56 is generally a two-lane rural highway that expands to a four-lane urban highway in Clinton and Spartanburg.  It travels  in a north-south direction, though it is signed east-west; to make it more confusing, signage in Spartanburg reverse the directions. SC 56 has a roundabout interchange, known as Hearon Circle, with I-85 Business. In Clinton, signage that bypasses the downtown area use "TRUCK" instead of normal or bypass banners; though SC 56 Business is signed through the downtown area.

History
SC 56 was established in 1928 as a new primary route from SC 392 (today SC 39) to U.S. Route 176 (US 176) in Pauline.  In 1949, SC 56 was extended north, replacing US 176 to US 29 in Spartanburg. In 1959, SC 56 was extended north, replacing US 176 along Asheville Highway to its current terminus at US 176. Sometime after 1990, SC 56 was bypassed southeast of downtown Clinton, leaving a business loop.

Major intersections

Special routes

Clinton business loop

South Carolina Highway 56 Business (SC 56 Bus.) is a  business route that traverses through downtown Clinton, in concurrency with SC 72 Bus. along Broad Street and Willard Road.

Spartanburg connector route

South Carolina Highway 56 Connector (SC 56 Conn.) is a  connector route between SC 56 and US 176/SC 9 in the central part of Spartanburg and the east-central part of Spartanburg. The entire length is known as East Henry Street and is an unsigned highway.

It begins at an intersection with the SC 56 mainline (known as Union Street east of here and also as East Henry Street west of here). It travels to the east-northeast and curves to the northeast, before reaching its eastern terminus, an intersection with US 176/SC 9 (South Pine Street). Here, the roadway continues as Glendalyn Avenue.

See also

References

External links

SC 56 at Virginia Highways' South Carolina Highways Annex
SC 56 Business at Virginia Highways' South Carolina Highways Annex

056
Transportation in Newberry County, South Carolina
Transportation in Laurens County, South Carolina
Transportation in Union County, South Carolina
Transportation in Spartanburg County, South Carolina